is a Japanese footballer who plays as a midfielder for Tochigi SC.

Career 
After playing for Omori junior soccer club in his early career he joined the youth of JEF United Chiba. He made his debut for the first team in the away loss (0–1) against FC Tokyo on 26 November 2011.

Club statistics
Updated to 23 February 2018.

References

External links
Profile at Mito HollyHock

1993 births
Living people
Association football people from Chiba Prefecture
Japanese footballers
J2 League players
J3 League players
JEF United Chiba players
Blaublitz Akita players
Mito HollyHock players
Thespakusatsu Gunma players
J.League U-22 Selection players
Tochigi SC players
Association football midfielders